The olomao (Myadestes lanaiensis) is a small, dark solitaire endemic to Maui, Lānai and Molokai in the Hawaiian Islands. It is listed as Critically Endangered or possibly extinct.  

The extinct ʻāmaui, either a subspecies of M. lanaiensis or a distinct species (as M. woahensis), was endemic to Oʻahu.

Description
It grows up to 7 inches in length. The male and female of the species look similar. It is dark brown above and gray below with blackish legs.

Call
Its song consists of a complex melody of flute-like notes, liquid warbles, and gurgling whistles. The call is a catlike rasp, with an alternate high pitched note similar to a police whistle.

Behavior and diet
It occurs in densely vegetated gulches, frequenting the understory where it often perches motionless in a hunched posture. Like other native Hawaiian thrushes, it quivers its wings and feeds primarily on fruit and insects.

Conservation
The olomao is still classified as Critically Endangered due to the possibility that an extremely small population or individuals may still exist.  The last definitive sighting occurred on Oahu in the 1850s, on Lanai in 1933, and on Molokai in 1980 in the Kamakou Preserve.  In the late 19th century, it was considered common to abundant on the Maui, Lanai, and Molokai, but land clearing, including the establishment and subsequent development of Lānai City, and avian malaria brought on by introduced mosquitoes decimated the birds.  Introduced animals such as feral pigs (which create pools from their wallows for breeding mosquitoes) also aided in its demise.

Taxonomy
It is closely related to the other species of Hawaiian thrushes, the puaiohi (M. palmeri), ōmao (M. obscurus), and the probably extinct kāmao (M. myadestinus).   
Maui birds may have constituted a separate subspecies or race, but became extinct before any studies could be performed.  Three subspecies are recognized:

M. l. woahensis - ʻāmaui
M. l. lanaiensis - Lānai thrush
M. l. rutha - Molokai thrush

References

External links
Species factsheet - BirdLife International
3D view of specimen RMNH 110.026 at Naturalis, Leiden (requires QuickTime browser plugin)

Myadestes
Endemic birds of Hawaii
Biota of Lanai
Biota of Maui
Biota of Molokai
Critically endangered fauna of Hawaii
Birds described in 1891
Taxa named by Scott Barchard Wilson
Taxonomy articles created by Polbot